Darlene Compton (born January 21, 1961) is a Canadian politician, the second and current deputy premier, minister of finance and the status of women of Prince Edward Island. She was elected to the Legislative Assembly of Prince Edward Island in the 2015 provincial election. She represents the electoral district of Belfast-Murray River as a member of the Progressive Conservative Party.

She was previously the party's candidate in the same district for a by-election in 2007, following the resignation of Pat Binns from the legislature, but lost to Charlie McGeoghegan. She ran again in the 2011 provincial election, again losing to McGeoghegan by a margin of just eight votes. She was subsequently a candidate in the party's 2015 leadership election, finishing third behind Rob Lantz and James Aylward.

On May 9, 2019 Compton was appointed deputy premier, following Premier Dennis King's recommendation.

As of June 2022, Compton is a shareholder in several energy and tobacco companies, including Halliburton and Phillip Morris.

Electoral record

References

Living people
Members of the Executive Council of Prince Edward Island
People from Queens County, Prince Edward Island
Progressive Conservative Party of Prince Edward Island MLAs
Women government ministers of Canada
Women MLAs in Prince Edward Island
21st-century Canadian politicians
21st-century Canadian women politicians
Finance ministers of Prince Edward Island
Female finance ministers
1961 births